KRI Bung Tomo (357) is a Bung Tomo-class corvette in service with the Indonesian Navy. She was originally built for the Royal Brunei Navy and launched as KDB Jerambak in 2002. Bung Tomo is the lead ship of her class.

Class background 
The Bung Tomo-class corvettes are three vessels built by BAE Systems Marine (now BAE Systems Maritime – Naval Ships). The contract was awarded to GEC-Marconi in 1995 and the ships, a variant of the F2000 design, were launched in January 2001, June 2001 and June 2002 at the then BAE Systems Marine yard at Scotstoun, Glasgow. The customer refused to accept the vessels and the contract dispute became the subject of arbitration. When the dispute was settled in favour of BAE Systems, the vessels were handed over to Royal Brunei Technical Services in June 2007.

In 2007, Brunei contracted the German Lürssen shipyard to find a new customer for the three ships.

The ships were originally armed with MBDA Exocet Block II anti-ship missiles and MBDA Seawolf air-defence missiles. The main gun is an OTO Melara 76 mm; the ship also carries two torpedo tubes, two 30 mm remote weapon stations and has a landing spot for a helicopter. As of 2018, the MBDA Seawolf missile was out of service there was plans to replace it with the VL Mica.

Construction and career 
KDB Jerambak was launched on 22 June 2002 and commissioned into the Indonesian Navy on 11 July 2014. She originally had the hull number 30 but were later changed to 357. She was never commissioned in the Royal Brunei Navy.

On 12 July 2018, KRI Bung Tomo arrived in Kochi Port, India for a two-day visit. Bung Tomo and KRI I Gusti Ngurah Rai visited Muara Port, Brunei from 8 to 11 December 2018. Both ships conducted PASSEX with  before departing for Jakarta, Indonesia.

References 

Royal Brunei Navy
2002 ships
Bung Tomo-class corvettes